The 36th Metro Manila Film Festival - Philippines (MMFF) is the 36th edition of the annual film festival in Manila, held from December 25, 2010 until January 7, 2011. The Awards Night (known as "Gabi ng Parangal") was held on December 26, 2010. During the festival, no foreign films are shown in Philippine theaters in order to showcase the locally produced films especially meant for the festival.

Star Cinema's Ang Tanging Ina Mo (Last na 'To!) topped the festival, winning nine awards including the Best Picture, Best Actress for Ai-Ai delas Alas, Best Supporting Actress for Eugene Domingo, Best Director for Wenn Deramas, Best Child Performer for Xyriel Manabat, and the Most Gender-Sensitive Film Award among others.

Philippine "Comedy King" Dolphy, meanwhile, took the Best Actor and Metro Manila Film Festival Award for Best Supporting Actor trophies for his roles in two separate movies, Father Jejemon and Rosario respectively.

Cinemabuhay and Studio 5's Rosario got seven awards including the Second Best Picture and the Gatpuno Antonio J. Villegas Cultural Awards, among others.

Changes from previous years
The November 28, 2010 Entertainment Column in Manila Bulletin, written by Crispina Martinez-Belen, announced changes for the 2010 film festival.

First, the commercial viability criterion (box-office performance of the entries) was removed. As of 2010, the criteria for the selection of Best Picture(s) were: artistry; creativity and technical excellence; innovation; and thematic value. Entries were also judged for global appeal (70 percent) and Filipino cultural and/or historical value (30 percent).

Another change in the 2010 festival format was a tribute to independent films with the screening of five indie films during the week preceding the festival. These films included Senior Year by Jerrold Tarog; Nasaan si Hefte by Jonnah Lim; Presa by Adolf Alix Jr.; Slow Fade by Rommel Sales; and Rindido by Noriel Jarito.

In addition, the established board of jurors was expanded to include housewives, drivers, students, teachers, etc.

Lastly, the festival logo was also changed to feature a map of the metropolis of Manila, based on the old seal of the Metropolitan Manila Development Authority with seventeen stars on it symbolizing the seventeen cities and municipality of Metro Manila. The logo for the first 35 festivals featured a torch.

Entries

Official entries
These were the eight mainstream films in the film festival.

Indie films
For the first time in the 36 editions of the Metro Manila Film Festival, it paid tribute to the independent filmmakers in the country by featuring five indie films in addition to the eight mainstream movie entries in the MMFF. These films were exhibited from December 16 to 20.
 Rindido - Noriel Jarito
 Presa – Adolfo Alix Jr.
 Nasaan si Hepte? - Jonah Añonuevo Lim
 Slow Fade - Rommel Sales
 Senior Year - Jerrold Tarog

Awards

The "Gabi ng Parangal" (Awards Night) was held on December 26, 2010 at the Meralco Theater and it was shown for the first time on GMA Network. Due to its obligation to show the wedding of Ogie Alcasid and Regine Velasquez, the telecast was shown later that night on a delayed basis.

{| class=wikitable
|-
! style="background:#EEDD82; width:50%" | Best Picture
! style="background:#EEDD82; width:50%" | Best Director
|-
| valign="top" |
Ang Tanging Ina Mo (Last na 'To!) - Star CinemaRosario - Cinemabuhay and Studio5 
RPG Metanoia - AmbientMedia and Star Cinema 
| valign="top" |Wenn V. Deramas - Ang Tanging Ina Mo (Last na 'To!)
|-
! style="background:#EEDD82; width:50%" | Best Actor
! style="background:#EEDD82; width:50%" | Best Actress
|-
| valign="top"|
Dolphy - Father Jejemon
| valign="top" |
Ai-Ai delas Alas - Ang Tanging Ina Mo (Last na 'To!)
Carla Abellana - Shake, Rattle and Roll 12: (Punerarya episode)
Marian Rivera - Super Inday and the Golden Bibe
|-
! style="background:#EEDD82; width:50%" | Best Supporting Actor
! style="background:#EEDD82; width:50%" | Best Supporting Actress
|-
| valign="top"|
Dolphy - Rosario
| valign="top" |
Eugene Domingo - Ang Tanging Ina Mo (Last na 'To!)
|-
! style="background:#EEDD82; width:50%" | Best Cinematography
! style="background:#EEDD82; width:50%" | Best Production Design
|-
| valign="top"|
Carlo Mendoza - Rosario
| valign="top" |
Joey Luna - Rosario
|-
! style="background:#EEDD82; width:50%" | Best Child Performer
! style="background:#EEDD82; width:50%" | Best Editing
|-
| valign="top" |
Xyriel Manabat  - Ang Tanging Ina Mo (Last na 'To!)
| valign="top"|
 John Wong - Rosario
|-
! style="background:#EEDD82; width:50%" | Best Original Story
! style="background:#EEDD82; width:50%" | Best Screenplay
|-
| valign="top" |
 Mel del Rosario - Ang Tanging Ina Mo (Last na 'To!)
| valign="top" |
 Mel del Rosario - Ang Tanging Ina Mo (Last na 'To!)
|-
! style="background:#EEDD82; width:50%" | Best Original Theme Song
! style="background:#EEDD82; width:50%" | Best Musical Score
|-
| valign="top" |
Ria Osorio and Gerard Salonga - ("Kaya Mo" - performed by Protein Shake ft. Ney and Kean Cipriano) - RPG Metanoia
| valign="top" |Jessie Lazatin - Ang Tanging Ina Mo (Last na 'To!)|-
! style="background:#EEDD82; width:50%" | Best Visual Effects
! style="background:#EEDD82; width:50%" | Best Make-up Artist
|-
| valign="top"|Rico Gutierrez - Si Agimat at si Enteng Kabisote| valign="top" |Si Agimat at si Enteng KabisoteNestor Dayao, et al. - Super Inday and the Golden Bibe
|-
! style="background:#EEDD82; width:50%" | Best Sound Recording
! style="background:#EEDD82; width:50%" | Best Float
|-
| valign="top" |Ditoy Aguila - Super Inday and the Golden Bibe andAmbient Media - RPG Metanoia| valign="top" |Rosario  - Cinemabuhay and Studio5|-
! style="background:#EEDD82; width:50%" | Most Gender-Sensitive Film
! style="background:#EEDD82; width:50%" | Best Indie Film
|-
| valign="top" |Ang Tanging Ina Mo (Last na 'To!)  - Star Cinema| valign="top" |Presa - Adolf Alix Jr.|-
! style="background:#EEDD82; width:50%" | Gatpuno Antonio J. Villegas Cultural Awards
|-
| valign="top" |Rosario  - Cinemabuhay and Studio5'|}

Indie Films
Best Indie Film: Presa'' - Adolf Alix Jr.

Multiple awards

Criticisms 
On December 28, 2010, multi-awarded Filipino blogger "The Professional Heckler" wrote with sarcasm: "Several people are questioning the results of the MMDA-organized Metro Manila Film Festival 'Gabi ng Parangal'. But that's totally unfair. Awards are subjective. Besides, why expect too much from the very same people who run the metro's traffic system?" He added: "(Malacañang) Palace spokesman Atty. Edwin Lacierda headed this year's MMFF board of jurors. Ignoring criticisms, Lacierda insisted that the list of winners was 'fine-tuned' before being made public."

Box Office gross
The Metro Manila Development Authority was criticized for not releasing the official final earnings of the Bottom 3 films.

References

External links

Metro Manila Film Festival
MMFF
MMFF
MMFF
MMFF
MMFF